The Ordnance BL 15-pounder, otherwise known as the 15-pounder 7 cwt, was the British Army's field gun in the Second Boer War and some remained in limited use in minor theatres of World War I. It fired a shell of 3-inch (76 mm) diameter with a maximum weight of , hence its name which differentiated it from its predecessor '12-pounder' 3-inch (76 mm) gun which fired shells weighing only .

History 
The gun was a modified version of the previous BL 12-pounder 7 cwt gun of 1883. A  shell was adopted and the gun was renamed a 15-pounder.

Mk I carriage : recoil was controlled by drag-shoes. These were placed under the wheels, and were connected by chains and cables to the wheel hubs and the trail.

Mk II carriage : this had the same drag-shoe system and also a hydraulic buffer. This only allowed a short recoil, and was not successful.

Mk III carriage : In 1899 a rudimentary recoil system was added, consisting of a "spade" beneath the axle which dug in when the gun recoiled, connected by a steel wire to a spring in a cylinder on the trail. Mk I and II carriages fitted with these were known as Mk 1* and Mk II*. The latter retained the hydraulic buffer.

Although the whole gun jumped and moved backwards on firing, the spring returned it to firing position and hence still increased the rate of fire compared to the old model without any recoil mechanism. Hogg and Thurston comment ironically : "It is said that it checked it [recoil] so well that the gun usually recoiled  and jumped forward ".

Other Mks of carriage followed, all with axle-spades, but without buffers.

From 1904 the BL 15-pounder was superseded by the modern QF 18-pounder. Remaining BL 15-pounders were upgraded as the BLC 15-pounder to equip the Territorial Force with an "ersatz QF gun".

Combat use 
The gun was normally towed by 6 horses, in 3 pairs.

Second Boer War 

349 guns were in service in the Second Boer War 1899–1902 and fired 166,548 shells out of the British total of 233,714.

The shrapnel shells in use were usually time-set to burst in the air above and in front of the enemy. The fuze could be set to explode on contact (percussion) up to the maximum range, but shrapnel exploding on contact was of little use.

World War I 

7th Field Battery (4 guns, originally No. 2 and No. 6 Light Batteries) towed by oxen and known as the Oxo Battery and manned by Mauritian and South African gunners fought in the German East Africa campaign in World War I.

Ammunition

See also 
 Ordnance BLC 15-pounder : modernised version
 Field artillery
 List of field guns

Weapons of comparable role, performance and era 
 7.7 cm FK 96 German equivalent

Surviving examples 
 HM Royal Armouries Fort Nelson, Fareham, Hampshire, England
 At the Royal Artillery Museum, Woolwich, London

Notes

References

Bibliography 
 Dale Clarke, British Artillery 1914–1919. Field Army Artillery. Osprey Publishing, Oxford UK, 2004 
 General Sir Martin Farndale, History of the Royal Regiment of Artillery : Forgotten Fronts and the Home Base 1914–18. London: Royal Artillery Institution, 1988. 
 Major Darrell D. Hall, "Guns in South Africa 1899–1902" in The South African Military History Society. Military History Journal – Vol 2 No 1, June 1971
 Major Darrell D. Hall, "Field Artillery of the British Army 1860–1960. Part I, 1860–1900" in The South African Military History Society. Military History Journal – Vol 2 No 4, December 1972 (web page is incorrectly titled 1900–1914)
 Major Darrell D. Hall, "Field Artillery of the British Army 1860–1960. Part II, 1900–1914" in The South African Military History Society. Military History Journal – Vol 2 No 5, June 1973
 Major Darrell D. Hall, "AMMUNITION: 15-PR 7 cwt BL". in The South African Military History Society Military History Journal – Vol 3 No 4, December 1975
 I.V.Hogg & L.F. Thurston, British Artillery Weapons & Ammunition 1914–1918. London: Ian Allan, 1972.

External links 

 Handbook for the 15-pr B.L. gun mark I Field batteries 1896
 Handbook for the 15-pr B.L. gun mark I Field batteries 1900
 Handbook for the 15-pr B.L. gun mark I Field batteries 1903
 Handbook for the 15-pr. B.L. gun field batteries 1904 at State Library of Victoria
 COLESKOP and the ARMSTRONG 15-POUNDER BL
 Mk III carriage diagram from Victorian Forts and Artillery website Society website
 Mk IV carriage diagram from Victorian Forts and Artillery website Society website

Field guns
Artillery of the United Kingdom
76 mm artillery